A. australis may refer to:

An abbreviation of a species name. In binomial nomenclature the name of a species is always the name of the genus to which the species belongs, followed by the species name (also called the species epithet). In A. australis the genus name has been abbreviated to A. and the species has been spelled out in full. In a document that uses this abbreviation it should always be clear from the context which genus name has been abbreviated.

Some of the most common uses of A. australis are:

 Aedes australis, a New Zealand brackish water mosquito species
 Agathis australis, the kauri, a coniferous tree species found north of 38°S in the northern districts of New Zealand's North Island
 Alsodes australis, a frog species found in Argentina and Chile
 Amaranthus australis, the southern amaranth or southern water-hemp, a plant species found in many Southern states, Mexico, the West Indies and South America
 Anchitherium australis, a prehistoric horse species in the genus Anchitherium
 Androctonus australis, a fat-tailed scorpion species found throughout the semi-arid and arid regions of the Middle-East and Africa
 Apteryx australis, the Southern brown kiwi, tokoeka or common kiwi, a bird species from New Zealand's South Island
 Arctophoca australis, the South American fur seal, a fur seal species that breeds on the coasts of Chile and Argentina
 Asota australis, a moth species found in Australia, Indonesia and Papua New Guinea
 Austroplebeia australis, a stingless bee species endemic to Australia

See also
 Australis (disambiguation)